The Day of the Barbarians: The Battle That Led to the Fall of the Roman Empire is a 2007 nonfiction book by Alessandro Barbero about the Battle of Adrianople. After two centuries in which the "barbarians" were successfully integrated in the Roman Empire, a particular episode seems to set the end of this age. Due to corruption and bad organization of the migration phenomenon, the Roman Empire started its fall after this single-day battle, which saw the Goths immigrants taking over the Roman army.

Bibliography 
 'The Day of the Barbarians: The Battle That Led to the Fall of the Roman Empire' (2007) Publishers Weekly, 254(4), 174 
 Desmond, Stewart. "Barbero, Alessandro. The Day of the Barbarians: The Battle That Led to the Fall of the Roman Empire." Library Journal, vol. 132, no. 10, 1 June 2007, p. 127.

External links 
 

Books about military history
Non-fiction books about immigration
2007 non-fiction books
Walker Books books